Madera (Spanish for "Wood") is a city and county seat of Madera County, California. As of the 2020 United States census, the city's population was 66,224.

Located in the San Joaquin Valley, Madera is the principal city of the Madera Metropolitan Statistical Area, which is part of the Fresno-Madera-Hanford Combined Statistical Area. The city is home to the Madera Unified School District.

History
The town was named after the Spanish term for lumber. The town was laid out by the California Lumber Company in 1876. From 1876 to 1931, a  water flume carried lumber from the mountains to Madera where the lumber was shipped by train.

The first post office at Madera opened in 1877. On May 16, 1893, Madera County officially became a county of the state of California and the town incorporated as the City of Madera on March 27, 1907. One of the city's first African Americans to hold an elected office was Rev. Naaman N. Haynes, who was voted in as a Madera Unified School District school board trustee in the 1960s.

Landmarks include the historic Madera County Courthouse, the notable Madera water tower, and a fully operational drive-in movie theater.

Geography
The Fresno River, a tributary of the San Joaquin River, passes through the city north of downtown.

Madera is the location of the Madera AVA wine region.

Climate
Madera has a steppe climate (Köppen: BSk), in the central zone of this climatic subtype.

Although snowfall is rare,  fell in January 1962.

Demographics

2010
The 2010 United States Census reported that Madera had a population of 61,416. The racial makeup of Madera was 30,640 (49.9%) White, 2,069 (3.4%) African American, 1,933 (3.1%) Native American, 1,369 (2.2%) Asian, 72 (0.1%) Pacific Islander, 22,603 (36.8%) from other races, and 2,730 (4.4%) from two or more races. Hispanic or Latino of any race accounted for 47,103 people (76.7% of the population).

The Census reported that 60,825 people (99.0% of the population) lived in households, 418 (0.7%) lived in non-institutionalized group quarters, and 173 (0.3%) were institutionalized.

There were 15,938 households, out of which 9,003 (56.5%) had children under the age of 18 living in them, 8,521 (53.5%) were opposite-sex married couples living together, 2,917 (18.3%) had a female householder with no husband present, 1,450 (9.1%) had a male householder with no wife present. There were 1,323 (8.3%) unmarried opposite-sex partnerships, and 97 (0.6%) same-sex married couples or partnerships. 2,374 households (14.9%) were made up of individuals, and 1,077 (6.8%) had someone living alone who was 65 years of age or older. The average household size was 3.82. There were 12,888 families (80.9% of all households); the average family size was 4.09.

The population was spread out, with 21,338 people (34.7%) under the age of 18, 7,732 people (12.6%) aged 18 to 24, 17,287 people (28.1%) aged 25 to 44, 10,407 people (16.9%) aged 45 to 64, and 4,652 people (7.6%) who were 65 years of age or older. The median age was 26.6 years. For every 100 females, there were 104.0 males. For every 100 females age 18 and over, there were 103.3 males.

The homeowner vacancy rate was 3.5%; the rental vacancy rate was 5.1%. 28,785 people (46.9% of the population) lived in owner-occupied housing units and 32,040 people (52.2%) lived in rental housing units.

2000
As of the census of 2000, there were 43,207 people, 11,978 households, and 9,438 families residing in the city. The racial makeup of the city was 48.2% White, 3.9% African American, 2.8% Native American, 1.4% Asian, 0.1% Pacific Islander, 38.0% from other races, and 5.7% from two or more races. Hispanic or Latino of any race were 67.8% of the population.

There were 11,978 households, out of which 48.4% had children under the age of 18 living with them, 53.7% were married couples living together, 17.5% had a female householder with no husband present, and 21.2% were non-families. 16.8% of all households were made up of individuals, and 7.9% had someone living alone who was 65 years of age or older. The average household size was 3.57 and the average family size was 3.90.

In the city, the population was spread out, with 35.4% under the age of 18, 12.5% from 18 to 24, 28.3% from 25 to 44, 14.9% from 45 to 64, and 8.8% who were 65 years of age or older. The median age was 26 years. For every 100 females, there were 102.8 males. For every 100 females age 18 and over, there were 101.1 males.

The median income for a household in the city was $31,033, and the median income for a family was $31,927. Males had a median income of $29,776 versus $23,210 for females. The per capita income for the city was $11,674. About 25.6% of families and 32.5% of the population were below the poverty line, including 40.0% of those under age 18 and 12.7% of those age 65 or over.

Current estimates
According to estimates by the US Census Bureau from July 1, 2019, the total population for the City of Madera was 65,860, and the median household income was $42,581.

Government
Madera, is governed by a mayor elected at large, and six city council members elected by the people in their districts. Madera is the County seat of the County of Madera.

Education

 School districts
 Madera Unified School District (K-12)
 High schools
 Madera High School
 Madera South High School
 Matilda Torres High School
Private schools
 Saint Joachim School (preK-8)
 Crossroads Christian School (preK-8)
 Higher education
 Madera Community College
 San Joaquin Valley College Madera (for-profit)
 Public libraries
 Madera County Public Library

Transportation
Within the city, State Route 99 carries traffic in a generally northwest / southeast orientation. East of the city, State Route 41 can be accessed via either eastbound county roads or via State Route 145, the latter of which turns from a northeast–southwest bearing to a directly south orientation within the city.

Just north of Madera is the Madera Amtrak station. A California High-Speed Rail stop is also planned.

There is a Greyhound bus station located downtown.

The City of Madera provides local intracity public transportation services under the Madera Metro branding. Madera residents can travel conveniently from neighborhoods to shopping centers, local schools, medical offices and work sites on the Madera Metro fixed-route transit services. Madera County Connection, a county agency, provides intercity bus services to other communities in Madera County.

Madera Municipal Airport is a general aviation airport owned and operated by the City of Madera. It is situated on approximately 524 acres on the northwest edge of the city and is supervised by the Madera Public Works Department. Madera residents also have access to the nearby Yosemite International Airport, located in Fresno.

Notable people
Noteworthy persons from Madera include:
 Frank Bergon, author of four novels, including Jesse's Ghost (2011) which is set in Madera
 Connor Brogdon, pitcher for the Philadelphia Phillies
 Dwayne Crump, defensive back for the St. Louis Cardinals
 Lee Evans (1947–2021), Olympic gold medalist and former world record holder in track and field
 Zoila Frausto Gurgel, women's mixed martial arts champion
 Lavar Johnson, American mixed martial artist who competed as a heavyweight for the Ultimate Fighting Championship (UFC)
 Jack W. Kelso (1934–1952), Medal of Honor recipient
 Oswaldo Lopez, winner of the 2011 Badwater Ultramarathon
 Frank McNally, all-pro football player
 Wally O'Connor, four-time Olympian in water polo & swimming and 1924 gold medalist
 Jeannine Riley, actress and star of Petticoat Junction
 Martha Baird Rockefeller, concert pianist, philanthropist, and wife of John D. Rockefeller Jr.
 Kathryn Grove Shipp (1904–1977), explosives expert; raised in Madera
 Avery Stafford, gospel and R&B vocalist
 Virginia Stroud, painter and former Miss Indian America
 La Schelle Tarver, outfielder for the Boston Red Sox
 Lorin Whitney, organist and recording artist
 Leroy Zimmerman, All-Pro professional football player, Hall of Fame softball pitcher, and teacher

See also

California wine

References

External links

 
 The Madera Tribune, a Madera city newspaper, founded on March 31, 1892
 Madera Chamber of Commerce

 
Incorporated cities and towns in California
County seats in California
Populated places established in 1876
Cities in Madera County, California
1876 establishments in California